Falkirk East was a county constituency represented in the House of Commons of the Parliament of the United Kingdom from 1983 until 2005. It was largely replaced by Linlithgow and East Falkirk, with some of its territory going to the new Falkirk constituency.

Boundaries
1983–1997: The Falkirk District electoral divisions of Avonside, Bainsford, Braes, Carriden, Dundas, Kalantyre, Kinneil, Laurmont, and Sealock.

1997–2005: The Falkirk District electoral divisions of Avonside, Braes, Carriden, Dundas, Kalantyre, Kinneil, Laurmont, and Sealock.

Members of Parliament

Election results

Elections in the 1980s

Elections in the 1990s

Elections in the 2000s

References 

Historic parliamentary constituencies in Scotland (Westminster)
Constituencies of the Parliament of the United Kingdom established in 1983
Constituencies of the Parliament of the United Kingdom disestablished in 2005
Politics of Falkirk (council area)